Shanshe, Duke of Ksani (born end of 17th century – died 1753), was a politician from Kingdom of Kartli-Kakheti. From 1718 was eristavi of Ksani.

In 1719 he insurrected against king of Kartli Vakhtang VI, but he was defeated and exiled to Imereti. He managed to escape from exile and rebelled in 1720 and was again defeated. However he adulated to the King Vakhtang VI and was devoted of his oath until the end.

In 1723 when Kartl-kakheti was conquered by Ottoman empire he was fighting against the intruders. In 1735 when Ottoman role in Kartl-Kakheti was changed by Iranians (Qizilbashs) Shanshe together with Givi Amilakhvari and Vakhushti Abashidze led big revolt against Iranian conquerors and from the strengthened fortresses in Ksani Saeristavo he was fighting for two years. But in 1737 he was finally defeated and had to escape to Imereti and later to Russia.

He was trying to help Bakar (Son of Vakhtang VI and factual king of Kartli) return. However, this mission was unsuccessful and he returned to Georgia and continued fighting against Qizilbashs. Because of betrayal he was captured by Iranians and punished by scooping eyes.

In 1745 he was sent back to Tbilisi, after two years he got back his manorial estates.
He died in Tbilisi in prison in 1753. Where he was imprisoned because of rebel against king Erekle II.

References 
 GSE, (1986) volume 10, page 683, Tbilisi.
 Gvasalia, J. (1973) Essays on Georgian history. volume 4. Tbilisi

1753 deaths
Politicians from Georgia (country)
Year of birth missing
Nobility of Georgia (country)